Coleophora bifurca is a moth of the family Coleophoridae.

References

bifurca
Moths described in 1988